Bangladesh Standard Time (BST) is the time zone of Bangladesh. It is offset six hours ahead of Coordinated Universal Time, and observed as a national standard throughout the country. Bangladesh briefly observed daylight saving time (DST) in 2009 to cope with the ongoing electricity crisis, but in 2010 the decision was cancelled by the government of Bangladesh.

The official time signal is given by the Bangladesh Standard Time is calculated on the basis of the 90.00° E longitude, which passes over the Harukandi Union of Harirampur Upazila of the Manikganj District in Dhaka Division, Bangladesh. In the IANA time zone database, it is represented by Asia/Dhaka.

History 

Between 1890 and 1941, the Bengal was under British Raj and used Calcutta time (UTC+5:53:20).

For a brief period in the 1940s, amidst World War II, there were a series of time zone changes in British India.

 On 1 October 1941, the region switched to UTC+06:30.
 On 15 May 1942, the following year, the region switched to UTC+05:30.
 On 1 September 1942, the same year, the region was returned to UTC+06:30.
 Following the partition of India in 1947, it was partitioned into dominions of India and Pakistan, of which East Bengal is now Bangladesh.
 On 15 September 1951, Dacca Time (DACT) was introduced in East Bengal by subtracting 30 minutes off UTC+06:30 to UTC+06:00, the official time zone used today.
 On 30 September 1951, the Dacca Time were made effective in East Bengal.

Daylight saving time 
The power division of the Ministry of Power, Energy and Mineral Resources proposed the DST scheme, discussing it with representatives from 18 to 19 different ministries on 5 April 2009, and were asked to return their views by 9 April. Most of the responses from the ministries were positive. June was selected instead of April or May, as the HSC examinations are run from 18 April through 28 May. The time was advanced by exactly 1 hour on the midnight of 19 June, and was planned to be set back two months later on the midnight of 30 September. The proposal primarily sought to reduce energy usage, as the energy crisis was the most severe in that period, with power demands of 4,800–5,800 MW against a generation capability of 3,800–4,000 MW. The time zone was advanced from UTC+06:00 to UTC+07:00.

Government officials in support of the scheme said that it was easier to save power than to generate more, but ultimately the scheme proved a failure. The change was criticised as early as days after the adoption of the scheme. People had not become accustomed to the change and businesses and shop owners had not followed the government's directives properly. Citizens also complained that the load-shedding situation hadn't improved. Power savings were nulled by increased consumption in the days following the change because of hot weather, as well as any residual savings being consumed by people who previously had less access to electricity. The country went back to its original UTC+06:00 time offset on the midnight of 31 December 2009, months later than the scheduled end and through the winter. Students and teachers were the first to be adversely affected as many had to leave for their institutions before sunrise. In December, the problem became worse, and the cabinet lifted the scheme.

DST was due to be observed again from 31 March through to 31 October in 2010. However, on 22 March 2010, the cabinet cancelled the scheme permanently, citing "public interest" and decided to remain in the former UTC+06:00 offset.

References

External links 
 The BST website , maintained by the Bangladesh Standards and Testing Institution (BSTI).

Time in Bangladesh
Time zones